766 Naval Air Squadron (766 NAS) was a Naval Air Squadron of the Royal Navy's Fleet Air Arm. It was to have initially formed in 1939 at RNAS Lee-on-Solent, as a Seaplane School, however, it formed at RNAS Machrihannish as a Night ALT (Attack Light Torpedo) Course, in 1942. It moved to RNAS Inskip, in 1943, to become part of No. 1 Naval Operational Training Unit. By 1944, it was operating over 30 swordfish aircraft, but, during the year, also acquired Firefly aircraft from 1772 NAS, and Sea Hurricane aircraft from 760 NAS. It moved to RNAS Rattray early in 1946, but later that year, moved to RNAS Lossiemouth where it received Seafire aircraft, along with being Part 1 of the Operational Flying School. By late 1951, Sea Fury trainer aircraft were also added to it's varied list of types operated. In 1953, the squadron moved to RNAS Culdrose, where it disbanded in 1954.

In 1955, it reformed at RNAS Yeovilton, with Sea Venom aircraft from 890 NAS, to form an All Weather Fighter Pool. Yeovilton's runways were undergoing reconstruction in 1956, so the squadron relocated to RNAS Merryfield, which was a satellite station of Yeovilton. In October 1957, the squadron became the Naval All Weather Fighter School, a task previously performed by 238 Operational Conversion Unit, at RAF North Luffenham. The title changed to All Weather Fighter Training Squadron, in 1958, when it returned to Yeovilton. When the initial Sea Vixen aircraft arrived, they were designated as 766B NAS, until the remaining Sea Venom were finally withdrawn, in October 1960. Sea Vixen FAW.2 aircraft were added to the initial FAW.1 aircraft, in 1965. The squadron disbanded at Yeovilton, in December 1970, when its task ended and it's aircraft were transferred to 890 NAS.

Aircraft had the code VL on tail and a 3 digit number assigned to each aircraft. VL-###

History of 766 NAS

Night Torpedo Course (1942 - 1943) 

766 Naval Air Squadron formed, on the 15 April 1942, at RNAS Machrihanish (HMS Landrail), situated close to Campbeltown, on the Kintyre peninsula, in Argyll and Bute, Scotland, as a Night Torpedo Course. The squadron was initially equipped with Swordfish and Albacore aircraft for this role. The course the squadron delivered was the Night ALT (Attack Light Torpedo) Course. In the August it added Fulmar aircraft to its inventory.

Operational Training Unit (1943 - 1946) 

Around fifteen months after forming, 766 NAS moved to RNAS Inskip (HMS Nightjar), near Inskip, a small village in the Fylde area of Lancashire, England, to become part of No.1 Naval Operational Training Unit, on the 7 July 1943. By October of that year, the Albacore aircraft were withdrawn from squadron use, however, in the following January, in 1944, the squadron received Anson aircraft to work alongside the Swordfish and Fulmar, and by the middle of the year, it had thirty one Swordfish on strength, which included three that were used by a Photographic Flight.

In the autumn of 1944, there were significant changes to the squadrons aircraft inventory. September 1944 saw the withdrawal of the Fulmar aircraft, however, during October, Firefly aircraft arrived, with the initial use of fourteen aircraft that had been given up by 1772 Naval Air Squadron. At the same time, the Albacore aircraft were withdrawn. November bought the arrival of Sea Hurricane aircraft, from the disbanding 760 Naval Air Squadron, at Inskip. 766 NAS remained at Inskip for roughly another twelve months, then moved to RNAS Rattray (HMS Merganser), located near Crimond in Aberdeenshire, Scotland, on 20 January 1946.

Operational Flying School (1946 - 1954) 

It operated out of Rattray for seven months before relocating again, on the 4 August 1946, with the squadron moving to RNAS Lossiemouth (HMS Fulmar), located by the town of Lossiemouth in Moray, north-east Scotland and becoming Part I of the Operational Flying School course. Here the squadron was equipped with Seafire aircraft, from August, to operate alongside it's existing Firefly. Around the middle of 1947, later variants of the Seafire arrived and by the September, the earlier versions had been withdrawn.

Seafire and Firefly continued as the squadron's main aircraft for the next few years, however, in late 1951 Sea Fury aircraft arrived and within a few months, by the November, the Seafire aircraft were withdrawn. In July 1952, the squadron gave up its Sea Fury aircraft and the main focus was on the Firefly. The following year, after around seven years at Lossiemouth, on the 3 October 1953, 766 NAS moved to RNAS Culdrose (HMS Seahawk), near Helston on the Lizard Peninsula of Cornwall, England, however, just over one year later, the squadron disbanded on the 25 November 1954.

All Weather Fighter Pool (1955 - 1957) 

766 Naval Air Squadron reformed, from 890 Naval Air Squadron, at RNAS Yeovilton (HMS Heron), sited a few miles north of Yeovil, in  Somerset, England, as an All Weather Fighter Pool, on the 18 October 1955. The squadron was initially equipped with eight Sea Venom aircraft, which were of the initial production type, the FAW.20 (Fighter, All-Weather). In January 1956, the Sea Venom were complimented with Sea Vampire two-seat trainer aircraft, however, by August both of these types were withdrawn and the squadron received a replacement with a later improved variation of the Sea Venom, the FAW.21.

All Weather Fighter Training Squadron (1957 - 1970) 

At Merryfield, in October 1957, 766 NAS became the Naval All Weather Fighter School. It took over the duties previously undertaken by No.238 Operational Conversion Unit at RAF North Luffenham, in training naval pilots and observers for all weather operations. On the 20 January 1958, the squadron returned back to RNAS Yeovilton.

May 1959, saw 766 NAS become the All Weather Fighter Training Squadron, still operating it's Sea Venom FAW.21. In October 1959, Sea Vixen aircraft arrived with a number of FAW.1 aircraft, however, these were designated 766B Naval Air Squadron. In May 1960 Hunter T.8 aircraft arrived, a Two-seat trainer for the Royal Navy, fitted with an arrestor hook for use on RN airfields, then, in October, the Sea Venom were withdrawn and the Sea Vixen became part of 766 NAS, with 766B disbanding on the 24 October 1960. In October 1962, the Hunter aircraft were withdrawn from squadron use, leaving 766 NAS solely with the Sea Vixen aircraft. July 1965 saw the arrival of an improved variant of the FAW.1, the Sea Vixen FAW.2 aircraft. Over the next three years FAW.1 aircraft were slowly withdrawn, with the last leaving 766 NAS in May 1968. The squadron continued with FAW.2 for the next couple of years, however, on the 10 December 1970, 766 Naval Air Squadron disbanded at Yeovilton, its task and aircraft going to 890 Naval Air Squadron.

Aircraft flown 

766 Naval Air Squadron has flown a number of different aircraft types, including:

Fairey Swordfish I (Apr 1942 - Nov 1944)
Fairey Albacore (Apr 1942 - Oct 1943)
Fairey Fulmar Mk.I (Aug 1942 - Sep 1944)
Fairey Fulmar Mk.II (Aug 1942 - Sep 1944)
Fairey Swordfish II (Apr 1943 - Nov 1944)
Avro Anson I (Jan 1944 - Mar 1949)
Fairey Swordfish III (Mar 1944 - Nov 1944)
Fairey Firefly FR.I (Oct 1944 - Nov 1954)
Hawker Sea Hurricane IIc (Nov 1944 - Mar 1945)
Miles Martinet TT.Mk I (1945 - Jun 1946)
Miles M.19 Master GT.II (Oct 1945)
Airspeed Oxford (Dec 1945 - Jun 1947)
North American Harvard III (Feb 1946 - Nov 1949)
Supermarine Seafire F Mk III (Aug 1946 - Sep 1947)
North American Harvard T.T. IIB (Jan 1947)
Supermarine Seafire F Mk XVII (Jun 1947 - Nov 1951)
Fairey Firefly T.Mk 1 (Jan 1948 - Nov 1954)
Fairey Firefly T.Mk 2 (Sep 1951 - Nov 1954)
Hawker Sea Fury T.20 (Sep 1951 - Jul 1952)
de Havilland Sea Venom FAW.20 (Oct 1955 - Aug 1956)
de Havilland Sea Vampire T.22 (Jan 1956 - Jul 1956)
de Havilland Sea Venom FAW.21 (Aug 1956 - Oct 1960)
de Havilland Sea Vixen FAW.1 (Oct 1959 - May 1968)
Hawker Hunter T.8 (May 1960 - Sep 1962)
de Havilland Sea Vixen FAW.2 (Jul 1965 - Dec 1970)

Naval Air Stations  

766 Naval Air Squadron operated from a number of naval air stations of the Royal Navy, in Scotland and England:
Royal Naval Air Station MACHRIHANISH (15 April 1942 - 7 July 1943)
Royal Naval Air Station INSKIP (7 July 1943 - 20 January 1946)
Royal Naval Air Station RATTRAY (20 January 1946 - 4 August 1946)
Royal Naval Air Station LOSSIEMOUTH (4 August 1946 - 3 October 1953)
Royal Naval Air Station CULDROSE (3 October 1953 - 25 November 1954)
Royal Naval Air Station YEOVILTON (18 October 1955 - 24 November 1956)
Royal Naval Air Station MERRYFIELD (24 November 1956 - 20 January 1958)
Royal Naval Air Station YEOVILTON (20 January 1958 - 10 December 1970)

Commanding Officers 

List of commanding officers of 766 Naval Air Squadron with month and year of appointment and end:

1942 - 1954
Lt-Cdr (A) R.E. Bibby, DSO, RNVR (Apr 1942-Jul 1943)
Lt-Cdr W. F. C. Garthwaite, DSC, RNVR (Jul 1943-Aug 1944)
Lt-Cdr E. B. Morgan, RANVR (Aug 1944-Jan 1946)
Mjr V. B. G. Chesman, DSO, MBE, DSC, RM (Jan 1946-Dec 1947)
Lt-Cdr T. W. Harrington, DSC & Bar, RN (Dec 1947-Mar 1949)
Lt-Cdr A. W. Bloomer, RN (Mar 1949-Jan 1951)
Lt-Cdr J. M. Henry, RN (Jan 1951-Dec 1952)
Lt-Cdr D. W. Winterton, RN (Dec 1952-Oct 1953)
Lt-Cdr P. Carmichael, RN (Oct 1953-Feb 1954)
Lt-Cdr E. F. Pritchard, RN (Feb 1954-Nov 1954)
1955 - 1970
Lt-Cdr L. Jeyes, RN (Oct 1955-Jan 1956)
Lt-Cdr P. J. Young, RN (Jan 1956-Feb 1956)
Lt-Cdr I. McKenzie, RN (Feb 1956-Apr 1956)
Lt-Cdr G. R. J. Elgar, RN (Apr 1956-Mar 1957)
Lt-Cdr W. A. M. Ferguson, DSO, RN (Mar 1957-May 1958)
Lt-Cdr K. Sinclair, RN (May 1958-Sep 1959)
Lt-Cdr J. F. Blunden, RN (Sep 1959-Jan 1960)
Lt-Cdr W. J. Carter, RN (Jan 1960-May 1960)
Lt-Cdr K. Sinclair, RN (May 1960-Apr 1961)
Lt-Cdr P. B. Reynolds, RN (Apr 1961-Feb 1963)
Lt-Cdr G. P. Carne, RN (Feb 1963-Aug 1964)
Cdr K. E. Kemp, RN (Aug 1964-Nov 1965)
Lt-Cdr B. G. Youns, RN (Nov 1965-Oct 1966)
Lt-Cdr G. W. G. Hunt, RN (Oct 1966-Jun 1968)
Lt-Cdr D.J. Dunbar-Dempsey, RN (Jun 1968-Jul 1969)
Lt-Cdr G. L. Shaw, RN (Jul 1969-Dec 1970)

766B NAS 1959 - 1960
Lt-Cdr K. Sinclair, RN (Oct 1959-Oct 1960)

References

Citations

Bibliography

700 series Fleet Air Arm squadrons
Military units and formations established in 1942
Military units and formations of the Royal Navy in World War II